Pedro Luis Sicard Sánchez is a Mexican actor.

Filmography

Telenovelas 
Las Bravo - Samuel Robles Entre el Amor y el Deseo - Rafael Valdivieso
Vidas robadas (2010) - Jose Enrique
Secretos del Alma (2008) - Santiago Alcázar
Cambio de Vida (2007) - Daniel Betanzos
Montecristo (2006) - Luciano
Machos (2005) - Alonso Mercader
Las Juanas (2004) - Juan de Dios
Dos chicos de cuidado en la ciudad (2003) - Jose Luis
La duda (2002) - Arturo
El País de las mujeres (2002) - Vicente
Como en el cine (2001) - Daniel
Primer amor... a mil por hora (2000) - Claudio
La usurpadora (1998)
Lucy Crown (1987)

TV series
Decisiones (2006) - Julio/Ernesto
Ni una vez más (2005)
La Vida es una Canción (2004)
Vivir Asi (2001; 2004)
Lo que Callamos las Mujeres (2002)

Movies 
Días Salvajes (2008) - Miguel
Lo que la Gente Cuenta (2007) - Alan
Corazones Rotos (2001) - Billy
Antes que Anochezca (1999)
La Bolsa o la Vida (1999)
Mujer Transparente (1988)
Una Novia para David (1986)

External links
 
Pedro Sicard biography in Biosstars database
Pedro Sicard biography and photos

Living people
People from Havana
Mexican male film actors
Mexican male telenovela actors
Mexican male television actors
Year of birth missing (living people)